Vipin Narang is the Principal Deputy Assistant Secretary of Defense for Space Policy. Narang has been an American political scientist. He is Professor of Political Science at MIT. He is known for his research on nuclear weapons, conflict and proliferation. His research has shown that there are different nuclear weapons postures. These postures have implications for the likelihood of conflict between nuclear states, as well as bargaining outcomes in disputes.

He has a BS and MS in Chemical Engineering from Stanford University, as well as a M.Phil in International Relations from University of Oxford and a PhD. from Harvard University. He was born in the San Francisco Bay area to parents of Indian descent.

References 

Harvard University alumni
American political scientists
Living people
International relations scholars
Year of birth missing (living people)
 Biden administration personnel